Tomáš Mojžíš (born May 2, 1982) is a Czech professional ice hockey defenceman playing for Slovan Bratislava of the Kontinental Hockey League.

Playing career
Mojžíš was drafted in the eighth round, 246th overall, by the Toronto Maple Leafs in the 2001 NHL Entry Draft. He has played for HC Pardubice (Czech Jr.), the Moose Jaw Warriors (WHL), Seattle Thunderbirds (WHL), Manitoba Moose (AHL), Peoria Rivermen (AHL), St. Louis Blues (NHL), and Vancouver Canucks (NHL).

He was a member of the Czech national inline hockey team at the 2008 Men's World Inline Hockey Championships in Bratislava, Slovakia.

On July 7, 2008, Mojžíš signed a multi-year contract with the Minnesota Wild. Tomáš featured in only four games with the Wild before he was later assigned to affiliate, the Houston Aeros for the majority of the 2008–09 season. He was subsequently released from the second year of his contract with the Wild and signed with Modo Hockey of the Swedish Elitserien on July 13, 2009.

On July 18, 2010, Mojžíš headed to Belarus and signed a one-year contract as a free agent with HC Dinamo Minsk of the KHL.

Awards
2003 – WHL West First All-Star Team
2003 – CHL First All-Star Team

Career statistics

Regular season and playoffs

International

Transactions
June 24, 2001 – Drafted in the eighth round, 246th overall by the Toronto Maple Leafs in the 2001 NHL Entry Draft
September 4, 2002 – Traded by the Toronto Maple Leafs to the Vancouver Canucks for Brad Leeb
March 9, 2006 – Traded by the Vancouver Canucks with the Canucks' third round selection (Vladimir Zharkov — later acquired by New Jersey) in the 2006 NHL Entry Draft to the St. Louis Blues for Eric Weinrich
July 7, 2008 – Signed as an unrestricted free agent by the Minnesota Wild
July 13, 2009 – Signed as an unrestricted free agent by Modo
July 18, 2010 – Signed as an unrestricted free agent by HC Dinamo Minsk

References

External links

 

1982 births
Czech ice hockey defencemen
Czech expatriate ice hockey players in Russia
HC Bílí Tygři Liberec players
HC Dinamo Minsk players
HC Dynamo Pardubice players
HC Lev Praha players
HC Sibir Novosibirsk players
HC Slovan Bratislava players
HC Sparta Praha players
HC TPS players
Houston Aeros (1994–2013) players
Living people
Manitoba Moose players
Minnesota Wild players
Modo Hockey players
Moose Jaw Warriors players
Sportspeople from Kolín
Peoria Rivermen (AHL) players
Seattle Thunderbirds players
St. Louis Blues players
Toronto Maple Leafs draft picks
Vancouver Canucks players
Czech expatriate ice hockey players in Canada
Czech expatriate ice hockey players in the United States
Slovak expatriate ice hockey players in Sweden
Czech expatriate ice hockey players in Finland
Czech expatriate ice hockey players in Slovakia
Czech expatriate sportspeople in Belarus
Expatriate ice hockey players in Belarus